Prion protein 2 (dublet), also known as PRND, or Doppel protein, is a protein which in humans is encoded by the PRND gene.

Function 

This gene is found on chromosome 20, approximately 20 kbp downstream of the gene encoding cellular prion protein, to which it is biochemically and structurally similar. The protein encoded by this gene is a membrane glycosylphosphatidylinositol-anchored glycoprotein that is found predominantly in testis. Mutations in this gene may lead to neurological disorders.

References

Further reading